The Demonstration Cities and Metropolitan Development Act of 1966 was enacted by the United States Congress to guarantee that federal grants were being spent on set projects in urban redevelopment. It was enacted as a broad urban planning program meant to revitalize cities and improve the welfare of people living in underdeveloped neighborhoods. The act provided aid to cities rebuilding blighted areas, while also offering measures that dealt with mass transit, beautification, conservation, water and air quality, public safety, and support for the arts and humanities.

History 
During the 1960s, President Lyndon B. Johnson initiated the expansion of federal grant programs for construction projects. In an effort to increase the need to coordinate these projects, the act helped coordinate projects for urban renewal, highways, transit, and other construction projects. These projects focused on the support of cities and metropolitan development. Therefore, Johnson remarked that the legislation 'recognizes that our cities are made of people, not just bricks and mortar."

During this time, Urban renewal gained both support and criticism. Individuals like Democrat Richard C. Lee, mayor of New Haven, Connecticut, and Democratic Congressman Robert Giaimo supported the continuation of anti-poverty programs with federal assistance. Critics of the bill feared the act would be too costly, and some argued against the “desegregation implicit in the ghetto busting bill.”

In June 1966, the House Committee on Banking and Currency Subcommittee on Housing held four weeks of hearings on housing and urban development legislation. Several bills were merged within the Housing and Urban Development Act of 1966, which was reported to the full committee on June 28, 1966. The House and Senate held a conference on October 17 and 18, 1966, and the conference report was approved by the Senate on October 18 and by the House on October 20. President Lyndon B. Johnson signed the Demonstration Cities and Metropolitan Development Act of 1966 into law on November 3, 1966.

Section 204
It asserted the federal interest in improving the coordination of public facility construction projects "to obtain maximum effectiveness of federal spending and to relate such projects to areawide development plans." It further required that all applications for the planning and construction of facilities be submitted to an areawide planning agency for review. The agency was required to be composed of local elected officials. The objective was to encourage the coordination of planning and construction of physical facilities in urban areas.

Impact
The act provided grants that would pay up to eighty percent of the cost of developing city demonstration programs and technical assistance from the Department of Housing and Urban Development (HUD). In response to these new requirements, many urban areas started new planning agencies or commissions to include elected officials on their policy boards. By the end of 1969, only seven metropolitan areas lacked an areawide review agency.

This Act allows the Secretary of Housing and Urban Development to provide financial and technical assistance to enable cities to plan and carry out programs designed to improve the quality of urban life in the United States. Projects included within this act that qualify for assistance include comprehensive plans to rebuild or revitalize disadvantaged areas. The United States Secretary of Housing and Urban Development is expected to emphasize the initiative of local civilians in the planning, development, and implementation of the demonstration programs.

References

1966 in law
89th United States Congress
United States federal legislation
United States federal legislation articles without infoboxes